Peter Poole Cowper (1 September 1902 – 26 September 1962) was an English professional footballer who played as an outside-forward in the 1920s and 1930s. Something of a journeyman, he played for ten clubs in his adult career, rarely spending more than two seasons with one club and only making a significant number of appearances for one Football League club, New Brighton, for whom he made 71 appearances from 1928 to 1930.

Football career
Cowper was born at Tyldesley, near Wigan and played for the nearby Atherton Collieries team before he had an unsuccessful trial in 1921 at Bolton Wanderers. He joined Wigan Borough in 1923 before briefly moving on to Rossendale United the following year.

In June 1924, he moved to east London and signed with West Ham United of the Football League First Division, where he made his Football League debut on 11 October 1924 in place of Tommy Yews, playing at outside-right in a 1–1 draw with Bury. Cowper retained his place for the next match before Yews returned. Although Cowper remained with the Hammers for another two years, he made no further first-team appearances.

In June 1927, Cowper moved to Second Division Grimsby Town, where he made four league appearances. After a brief spell at Lancaster Town in the summer of 1928, Cowper moved on to New Brighton in August. Cowper stayed for two years for the Football League Third Division North side in which he made 71 league appearances, scoring 19 goals.

He moved to the south coast in June 1930, to return to the Second Division with Southampton. He made his debut for the Saints when he took the place of Irish international Laurie Cumming at inside-right in a 3–0 home defeat by Tottenham Hotspur on 26 December 1930. Cumming returned for the next match; later in the season, Cowper made three appearances at outside-right in place of Bert Jepson, followed by a single first-team appearance in February 1932. In his two years at The Dell, Cowper only managed five first-team appearances without scoring, although he scored 33 goals in 50 matches for the reserves.

Cowper was transferred to Southport in March 1932 where he only stayed four months before moving on to Carlisle United in July. After a year at Carlisle, he dropped out of the Football League and had spells in non-league football. He spent one season at Wigan Athletic, scoring 13 goals in 37 Cheshire League games, and went on to play for Altrincham and Prescot Cables.

References

External links
Career details on www.11v11.com

1902 births
1962 deaths
People from Tyldesley
English footballers
Association football forwards
Atherton Collieries A.F.C. players
Wigan Borough F.C. players
Rossendale United F.C. players
West Ham United F.C. players
Grimsby Town F.C. players
Lancaster City F.C. players
New Brighton A.F.C. players
Southampton F.C. players
Southport F.C. players
Carlisle United F.C. players
Wigan Athletic F.C. players
Altrincham F.C. players
Prescot Cables F.C. players
English Football League players